Mulago is a hill in north-central Kampala, the capital city of Uganda. The name also applies to the neighborhoods that sit on this hill.

Location
Mulago is in Kawempe Division, one of the five administrative divisions of Kampala. The coordinates of Mulago are 0°20'33.0"N, 32°34'37.0"E (Latitude:0.342508; Longitude:32.576959).

History

"Mulago was derived from the Ganda word 'omulago', a type of medicine, kept on this hill that was used by King Suna II for protection against spirits. The landmark on this hill is Mulago Hospital. Built in 1917, Old Mulago Hospital merged with the New Mulago Hospital in 1960 to form a giant complex that is the national referral hospital. The complex also houses Makerere University Medical School."

Mulago neighborhood
The British High Commission office and the High Commission office of Rwanda are both located in neighboring Kamwookya.

The hill is, however, dominated by hospital related activities that include:
 A doctors' village
 A nurses' Hostel
 Infectious Diseases Institute
 Mulago National Referral Hospital
 Makerere University College of Health Sciences
 Makerere University School of Medicine
 Makerere University School of Public Health
 Makerere University School of Biomedical Sciences
 Makerere University School of Health Sciences
 Mulago Women's Referral Hospital
 Upper Mulago Regional Referral Hospital
 Uganda Cancer Institute
 Uganda Heart Institute
 MU-JHU Care Ltd | MU-JHU (Makerere University-Johns Hopkins University) Research Collaboration
 Kampala City Mortuary
 Research Laboratories
 Pharmacies

Other prominent structures and buildings in the neighborhood 
 Corner house by Property Services Limited
 Tagore Apartments
 Iwat Solutions
 Uganda Radio Network
 Daks Couriers
 Kitante Medical Centre
The headquarters of the Uganda Ministry of Health is located at Wandegeya, in the valley between Nakasero Hill and Mulago Hill. There is a small residential area on Mulago Hill, overlooking the Uganda National Museum. Also, there is a market at Kamwookya, between Kololo Hill and Mulago Hill. The Uganda Electricity Transmission Company Limited maintains a large electricity sub-station at Mulago, which distributes power to the northern part of the city, including Makerere University, the Mulago Hospital Complex, Old Kampala and most of Nakasero Hill.

See also
Kampala Capital City Authority

References

External links
Kampala City Guide
Makerere University of Health Sciences Homepage

Neighborhoods of Kampala
Kawempe Division